Huang Haibo (born 1965) is the Deputy Head of Phoenix Chinese Channel; Director of the Chief Editor's Office, Phoenix Satellite Television Hong Kong. He was born in Beijing, 1965, now living in Hong Kong. Huang is married with one daughter.

Biography
Huang Haibo joined Phoenix TV in 2002 after serving China Central Television for several years. More than 20 years experience in the field of journalism, participating in many of the production; scheme and supervising of feature programs and major documentaries.

He himself is also anchoring several current affairs shows and documentary TV columns and sometimes appears at news reporting fronts. Proficient in Chinese, English and Japanese.

Education
BA in International Journalism, Beijing Broadcasting Institute(Communication University of China)
Research student of Film Studies, the Graduate school of Waseda University, Japan
EMBA of School of Business and Management, The Hong Kong University of Science and Technology

Social Titles

Part-time Members of the Central Policy Unit Hong Kong SAR, 2012
Representative of 6 consecutive sections of Sino-Japanese Media Conversation held by The State Council Information Office of PRC and The Executive Commission of the Japanese Chinese Journalist Communication, Japan. 2007-2011
Jury Actualites, The 49th Festival de Television de Monte-Carlo, 2009
Jury or decision maker of numerous documentary film festivals
Guest Professor, Hua Qiao University, China
Consultant, Chinese Studies Program, Dept. of Sociology, Hong Kong Baptist University
Co-founder and Vice Chairman of Hua Jing Society, Hong Kong
Moderator of BOAO Forum, 2013

References

http://news.hexun.com/2013-04-07/152885297.html
http://www.ecns.cn/business/2013/04-08/57619.shtml
Huang Haibo, the Phoenix TV anchor and moderator, pointed to problems with public health and food safety in some cities as a damning indictment of the poor state of urbanization in China and said that the country should learn from other examples.
http://www.best-news.us/news-4256890-Photo:-Hong-Kong-Phoenix-Chinese-Channel-deputy-editor-in-chief-and-presenter-Huang-Haibo.html
Photo: Hong Kong Phoenix Chinese Channel, deputy editor-in-chief and presenter Huang Haibo
http://www.like-news.us/?i1758749-New-media-era-documentaries-go-from-here--The-industry:-do-not-consider-fund-raising
Documentary as a fund-raising platform for new media, the Assistant Director of the Phoenix Chinese Channel, Huang Haibo put forward different views., He said, the network is a very open, reciprocal platform, I hope you do so consider the problem of fund-raising, let more people see the film as the main purpose of the future look at whether there is a profit model feedback. surprise film 'Some people, such broadcast on the network, we have to meet, but I think value of this thing. 
http://cmp.hku.hk/2011/03/25/11130/
Distinguished among Chinese language media, journalists for the Hong Kong-based Phoenix Television continued to report from the front lines after most mainland reporters were recalled. Huang Haibo (黄海波), assistant station director at Phoenix TV, has been one of the few non-Japanese journalists on the front lines to speak Japanese. Equipped with protective gear, radiation detection equipment and a cameraman, he has been making reports from just outside the 20 kilometer exclusion zone surrounding the Fukushima nuclear power plant.
http://www.thestandard.com.hk/news_detail.asp?pp_cat=15&art_id=132963&sid=39495590&con_type=3&d_str=20130418
http://ccdf.cnex.org.tw/?p=3701

External links
Huang Haibo introduction
Haibo Huang as guest of 2012 CNEX Documentary Film Festival
Huang Haibo's view on nation's urbanization
Huang Haibo Stayed in front line of Japan disaster report as a foreign journalist who spoke Japanese

1965 births
Living people